Nationality words link to articles with information on the nation's poetry or literature (for instance, Irish or France).

Events
 T. S. Eliot founds the Poetry Book Society in the U.K.
 George Plimpton, Peter Matthiessen and Harold L. Humes found The Paris Review.
 Nuovi Argomenti, an influential Italian literary magazine, founded by Alberto Carrocci and Alberto Moravia in Rome.
 The October issue of Atlantic Monthly magazine in the United States publishes "Perspectives of India", anthologizing poems from India.
 November 5 – Dylan Thomas, on a poetry reading tour of the United States, is admitted to Saint Vincent's hospital in Manhattan in a coma from which he does not recover before his death on November 9.

Works published in English
Listed by nation where the work was first published and again by the poet's native land, if different; substantially revised works listed separately:

Canada
 Robert Finch, A Century has Roots.
 Irving Layton, Love the Conqueror Worm. Toronto:  Contact Press.
 Douglas Le Pan, The Net and the Sword, Canada
 E. J. Pratt, The Titanic, Canada
 Raymond Souster, Shake Hands with the Hangman: Poems 1940-52 Toronto: Contact Press.

India, in English
 Nissim Ezekiel, Sixty Poems ( Poetry in English ), Bombay
 Harindranath Chattopadhyaya:
 I Sing of Man and Other Poems ( Poetry in English ), Bombay: People's Publishing House
 Spring in Winter ( Poetry in English ), Delhi: Atma Ram
 Manjeri Sundaraman Manjeri, Rhapsody in Red ( Poetry in English ),
 Romen, The Golden Apocalypse, Pondicherry: Sri Aurobindo Ashram
 Sri Aurobindo, The Future Poetry, essays on literary criticism, drawing on the author's (also published) views of art and life, (first appeared in the Arya, 1917–1920; later expanded with the author's letters on art, literature and poetry in the Centenary Library edition, Volume 9, 1971)

United Kingdom
 Charles Causley, Survivor's Leave
 Sir John Betjeman, A Few Late Chrysanthemums
 Louis MacNeice, Autumn Sequel
 Charlotte Mew (died 1928), Collected Poems
 Lewis Spence, Collected Poems
 John Heath-Stubbs, New Poems
 John Heath-Stubbs and David Wright. editors, The Faber Book of Twentieth Century Verse: An Anthology of Verse in Britain 1900-1950, a selection in self-conscious contrast to the Faber Book of Modern Verse
 R.S. Thomas, The Minister

Poets in the anthology Images of Tomorrow
John Heath-Stubbs edited this volume, published in the United Kingdom, which included poems from these writers:
Dannie Abse – Drummond Allison – Eurasia Anderson  - William Bell – Thomas Blackburn – Maurice Carpenter  - Alex Comfort – Yorke Crompton – N. K. Cruikshank – Keith Douglas – George Every – John Fairfax – G. S. Fraser – John Gibbs – W. S. Graham  - F. Pratt Green – J. C. Hall – Michael Hamburger – John Heath-Stubbs – Glyn Jones – Sidney Keyes – Francis King – James Kirkup – Norman Nicholson – I. R. Orton – Michael Paffard – Kathleen Raine – Anne Ridler – Walter Roberts – W. R. Rodgers – Joseph Rykwert – John Smith – Muriel Spark – Derek Stanford – J. Ormond Thomas – W. Price Turner – John Wain – John Waller  – Vernon Watkins – Gordon Wharton  - Margaret Willy – David Wright

United States
 Conrad Aiken, Collected Poems
 John Ashbery, Turandot and Other Poems
 W. H. Auden, "The Shield of Achilles" poem first published; his poetry book of the same name will be published in 1955
 Joseph Payne Brennan, The Humming Stair (Big Mountain Press/Alan Swallow imprint)
 Robert Creeley, American published in Europe:
The Kind of Act of
The Immoral Proposition
 E. E. Cummings, i — six nonlectures from his Charles Eliot Norton Lectures of 1951-1952 (Harvard University Press)
 Richard Eberhart, Undercliff: Poems 1946–1953
 Jean Garrigue, The Monument Rose
 Kenneth Koch, Poems
 Charles Olson:
 In Cold Hell, In Thicket, published in Origin as its eighth issue
 Mayan Letters, letters to the poet Robert Creeley, report on the author's research into Mayan hieroglyphs and discuss Olson's ideas on "objectism" in poetry. (criticism)
 Ezra Pound, translator, The Translations of Ezra Pound
 George Santayana, The Poet's Testament, verse drama
 May Sarton, The Land of Silence
 Karl Shapiro, Poems 1940-1953, New York: Random House
 W. D. Snodgrass, Heart's Needle, New York: Knopf
 David Derek Stacton, An Unfamiliar Country: 25 Poems
 Gertrude Stein, Bee Time Vine and Other Pieces (1913–1927), fiction and verse
 Wallace Stevens, Collected Poems
 Melvin Tolson, Libretto for the Republic of Liberia
 David Wagoner, Dry Sun, Dry Wind
 Robert Penn Warren, Brother to Dragons

Other in English
 James K. Baxter, The Fallen House, New Zealand
 Nissim Ezekiel, Sixty Poems, verses written from 1945 to 1951; India

Works published in other languages

French language

Canada, in French
 Jean-Guy Pilon, La fiancée du matin: poèmes, Montréal: Éditions Amicitia

France
 Yves Bonnefoy, Du mouvement et de l'immobilité de douve
 Rene-Guy Cadou, Helene ou le regne vegetal, Volume 2 (see Volume 1 1952), published posthumously (died 1951)
 Maurice Chappaz, Testament du Haut-Rhône, Swiss, French-language
 Andrée Chedid, Textes pour le vivant
 Jean Follain, Territoires
 Philippe Jaccottet, L'Effraie et autres poèmes, the author's first book of poetry to appear in France; publisher: Gallimard
 Saint-John Perse, Vents

India
In each section, listed in alphabetical order by first name:

Kannada
 R. S. Mugali, Kannada Sahitya Caritre, a history of Kannada literature, written in that language, up to the 19th century
 Siddayya Puranika, Jalapata, lyrics
 Virasaiva Sahitya Mttu Itihasa, literary history of "Veerashaiva" literature in three volumes

Kashmiri
 Amir Shah Kreri, Zafar Nama, a masnavi commemorating an episode of Islamic conquest and based on a Persian original; the poem became very popular in some rural areas
 Mohammad Amin Kamil, Saqi Nama, a masnavi
 Rasul Bath ("most probably the same person known now as Rasul Pompur", according to Indian academic Sisir Kumar Das), Ab e Hayat
 Rahman Rahi, Sanavany Saz
 Rasa Javidani, Tuhfa-e bahar, the Urdu-language poet's first book of Kashmiri-language poems

Malayalam

 Elamkulam Kunjan Pillai, Unninilisandesam, commentary on a 14th-century Manipravala poem
 K. Kittunni Nayar, Mahakavi Vallattol, biography of the poet Vallathol
 Ulloor Paramesvara Ayyar, Kerala Sahitya Caritram, in 1995, Indian academic Sisir Kumar Das called this book the "most comprehensive history of the Malayalam and Sanskrit literatures of Kerala"; published posthumously, in five volumes, starting this year, with the last volume coming out in 1955

Other languages of the Indian subcontinent

 Ananta Pattanayak, Santisikhar, Oriya
 Felix Paul Noronha, writing in the Konkani dialect of the Marathi language:
 Kaviyam Jhelo
 Kristanu Puranatli Vinchovan
 Ghulan Rabbani Taban, editor, Shikast-i zindan, Urdu-language poems about the independence struggle in India and other Asian countries
 Kripal Singh Kasel and Parminder Singh, Punjabi Sahit Di Utpatti Te Vikas, history of Punjabi literature, written in that language
 Lekhnath Poudyal, Tarun-Tapasi, a poem on contemporary affairs written mostly in the Sikharini meter; considered the magnum opus of the author, who calls it a navya kavya; Nepali
 Nagarjun, Yug Dhara, poems on current affairs; Hindi
 Narayan, also known as "Shyam", Rupa maya, a sequence of 16 sonnets on the myth of Visvamitra and Menaka; Sindhi
 Nanuram Samskarta, Samay Vayaro, in blank verse; Rajasthani
 Nidudavolu Venkatarao, Telugu Kavula Caritra, biographical information about many Telugu poets (see also a larger work of the same nature, Daksina Desiyandhra Vangmayamu 1954)
 Nilmani Phookan, Surya Heno Nami Aahe Eyi Nadiadi, Rangiya, Assam: Prakashan Ghar, Assamese-language
 Priyakant Maniar, Pratik, the author's first book of verses; 65 poems Gujarati
 Shri Shrimat Kumar Vyas, editor, Alagojo, anthology of poems by Rajasthani authors
 Sudhindra Nath Datta, Sambarta, called "[o]ne of the major works in modern Bengali poetry", according to Sisir Kumar Das

Other languages
 Arturo Corcuera, Cantoral, Peruvian writing in Spanish
 Hermann Hesse, Die Gedichte, German

Awards and honors

 Canada: Governor General's Award, poetry or drama: The Net and the Sword, Douglas LePan

United Kingdom
 King's Gold Medal for Poetry: Arthur Waley

United States
 American Academy of Arts and Letters Gold Medal for Poetry: Marianne Moore
 National Book Award for Poetry: Archibald MacLeish, Collected Poems: 1917-1952
 Pulitzer Prize for Poetry: Archibald MacLeish: Collected Poems 1917-1952
 Bollingen Prize: Archibald MacLeish and William Carlos Williams
 Fellowship of the Academy of American Poets: Robert Frost
 North Carolina Poet Laureate: James Larkin Pearson appointed.

Births
 February 5 – Giannina Braschi, Puerto Rican-born poet and novelist
 January 7 – Dionne Brand, Canadian poet, novelist, and non-fiction writer born and raised in Trinidad and Tobago before moving to Canada
 January 12 – David Brooks, Australian
 February 18 – Peter Robinson, English
 February 24 – Jane Hirshfield, American poet and translator
 February 27 – Brad Leithauser, American
 May 12 – Neil Astley, English editor
 July 20 – Joseph Bathanti, American poet, novelist and professor; North Carolina Poet Laureate, 2012–2014
 July 29 – Frank McGuinness, Irish playwright, translator and poet
 August 10 – Mark Doty, American
 August 27 – Gjertrud Schnackenberg, American
 August 31 – György Károly (died 2018), Hungarian
 October 1 – John Hegley, English performance poet
 October 20 – Robyn Bolam, English
 November 19 – Tony Hoagland (died 2018), American
 Also:
 Alison Brackenbury, English
 Patrick Deeley, Irish
 Adeeb Kamal Ad-Deen, Iraqi, Arabic language poet living in Australia
 Antonis Fostieris, Greek
 Rita Kelly, Irish language
 Chris Mansell, female Australian poet and publisher
 Ian McBryde, Canadian-born poet living in Australia

Deaths
Birth years link to the corresponding "[year] in poetry" article:
 February 25 – Mokichi Saitō (born 1882), Taishō period poet of the Araragi school and psychiatrist; father of novelist Kita Morio (surname: Saitō)
 April 6 – Idris Davies (born 1905), Welsh poet, originally writing in the Welsh language, but later exclusively in English
 May 22 – Louis Lavater (born 1867), Australian composer and writer
 May 28 – Tatsuo Hori 堀 辰雄 (born 1904), Japanese, Shōwa period writer, poet and translator (surname: Hori)
 July 16 – Hilaire Belloc, 82 (born 1870), French-born English poet, essayist and travel writer whose "cautionary tales", humorous poems with a moral, are the most widely known of his writings, from burns resulting from a fall into a fireplace
 September 1 – Bernard O'Dowd (born 1866), Australian co-founder of newspaper Tocsin
 September 3 – Shinobu Orikuchi 折口 信夫, also known as Chōkū Shaku 釋 迢空 (born 1887), Japanese ethnologist, linguist, folklorist, novelist and poet; a disciple of Kunio Yanagita, he established an academic field named , a mix of Japanese folklore, Japanese classics and Shintō religion (surname: Orikuchi)
 November 9 – Dylan Thomas, 39 (born 1914), Welsh poet, from an alcohol-related cerebral incident
 November 30 – Francis Picabia (born 1879), French avant-garde painter, poet and typographer
 December 7 – Helena Jane Coleman (born 1860), Canadian poet
 Also:
 George Herbert Clarke (born 1873), English-born Canadian academic and writer

See also

 Poetry
 List of poetry awards
 List of years in poetry

Notes

20th-century poetry
Poetry